Hugh Tucker (c. 1537 – c. 1586) was an English politician.

He was a Member (MP) of the Parliament of England for Salisbury in 1572.

References

1530s births
1580s deaths
English MPs 1572–1583